Limnobaris dolorosa  is a species of weevil native to Europe.

Its size lies between 2,8 and 4,5 mm.

Taxonomy 
The Limnobaris dolorosa belongs to the family of the Curculionidae.

Location 
It lives in Austria, Schladminger Tauern, Mariapfarr on the plants Cyperaceae and Juncaceae.

References

Sources 
"Käfer der Welt" (beetles of the world) https://www.kaefer-der-welt.de/limnobaris_dolorosa.htm

Curculionidae
Beetles described in 1777
Beetles of Europe